Homey is the second studio album by the American math rock band Chon. It was released on June 16, 2017, through Sumerian Records. It was the band's first release not to feature bassist Drew Pelisek.

Track listing
Adapted from iTunes

Personnel
Chon
 Mario Camarena – guitar
 Nathan Camarena – drums
 Erick Hansel – guitar/bass

Guest Musicians
 Brian Evans – drums (Tracks: 1, 2, 5, 12)
 Anthony Crawford – bass guitar (Tracks: 1, 2, 4, 5, 12)
 GoYama - producer (Track 3)
 Lophiile - producer (Track 6)
 Masego - vocals (Track 6)
 Giraffage - producer (Track 9)
 ROM - producer (Track 11)

Production
 Chon – producer
 John Greenham – mastering
 Eric Palmquist – engineer, producer

References

2017 albums
Chon (band) albums
Sumerian Records albums